The Acors Barns House is located at 68 Federal Street at the corner of Meridian Street in New London, Connecticut. Barns was a wealthy merchant in the whaling industry whose company became one of the largest whaling firms in the city. He managed to avoid the collapse of whaling by investing elsewhere; he was the founder of the Bank of Commerce in 1852, and his son and grandson succeeded him as president.

Built in 1837, the Acors Barns House is a two-and-one-half story Greek Revival house with a gable roof and clapboarded exterior. The front facade of the house is five bays wide with a Greek Revival portico leading to the main entrance. Additions to the house include a projecting center dormer, and second-story projection over a partially enclosed veranda. The plain exterior is contrasted by interior's elaborate hall ceilings, detailed woodwork and arched marble fireplaces. Journalist David Collins wrote in The Day newspaper that the Acors Barns house is a "fine and rare example" of architecture that is especially important to New London. 

The Acors Barns House was added to the National Register of Historic Places (NRHP) on April 22, 1976.

Acors Barns 
Born in 1794, Acors Barns was the son of a mariner and lived in Westerly, Rhode Island and Stonington, Connecticut before moving to New London, Connecticut and forming a whaling company with William Williams Jr. in 1827. The company prospered and became one of the largest firms in the city, but Barns avoided the 1849 decline of the whaling industry by investing elsewhere. He invested in the Willimantic and Palmer Railroad before establishing the Bank of Commerce in 1852.  Barns died in 1862, but his sons would succeed him a president of the successful bank.

Design 
Built in 1837, the Acors Barns House is a two-and-one half story Greek Revival house with a gable roof and clapboarded exterior. The front facade of the house is five bays wide with 6-over-6 sash and the main entrance has a Greek Revival portico supported by fluted Doric columns from top step. The simple single-panel door is surrounded by sidelights. The corners of the building have simple pilasters and four chimneys rising from the top. The rear of the house has a one-story veranda with a shallow hipped roof that is supported by square columns with a simple balustrade. The veranda has large 6-over-9 sash windows that extend almost a full story. In 1975, the area surrounding the property has undergone significant change, but the house is surrounded by trees and shrubs and a wrought iron fence that helps set it apart from the neighborhood.

Modifications to the house include the addition of a large pediment-shaped dormer that projects from the center of the main roof and is lighted by a rectangular double window. Part of the veranda was enclosed and the stairs that lead to a formal garden were removed. Above the center of the veranda is a second-story projection that was described as visually compromising the elegance of the rear facade.

The plain exterior is contrasted by the elegance of the interior of the house. The house has elaborate hall ceilings, detailed woodwork and arched marble fireplaces. The floor plan is built around the central hall with an offset stairway. The parlor rooms to the right are separated by a wide archway. The two rooms to the left are a dining room and a pantry that has a dumbwaiter to the kitchen in the cellar. The National Historic Register of Places nomination noted that the cellar contained the "remains of the kitchen, washroom and wine cellar". The second floor is made of four chambers and the attic consists of five small rooms. The attic's rooms served as the servants' cubicles.

Owners 
The Acors Barns House has gone through several owners over its lifetime. In 1862, the house passed from Acors Barns to his son William H. Barns. In 1893, the second son, Charles Barns acquired the title to the house and transferred it upon his death to Harriet Barns Vincent, the daughter of his sister. Harriet Barns Vincent sold the house to Julia O'Sullivan in 1919. Francis McGuire purchased the house in 1956, and used it to house the offices of his law firm; it would later pass to James McGuire, who in 2013 sold the house to the Community Foundation of Eastern Connecticut for $325,000. The foundation stated it would continue to preserve the house's historical integrity.

Importance 
In the NRHP information about the house, Bruce Clouette writes, "The Barns house physically documents the symbiosis by which the wealthy and the propertyless shared a home. Its value as an artifact is enhanced by the successful reuse which has retained the character of the building." David Collins of The Day wrote, "The Barns house is also especially important to New London because it is such a fine and rare example of the architectural fabric of the big swath of the downtown that was demolished in urban renewal in the 1960s."

See also
National Register of Historic Places listings in New London County, Connecticut

References

External links

Houses on the National Register of Historic Places in Connecticut
Houses completed in 1837
Houses in New London, Connecticut
National Register of Historic Places in New London County, Connecticut
1837 establishments in Connecticut